Makiadi Pambani (born 24 August 1985) is a retired Congolese football defender.

References 

1985 births
Living people
Footballers from Kinshasa
Democratic Republic of the Congo footballers
Democratic Republic of the Congo international footballers
Association football defenders
AS New Soger players
AS Vita Club players
FC Saint-Éloi Lupopo players
21st-century Democratic Republic of the Congo people